The 2019–20 Algerian Ligue Professionnelle 2 was the 56th season of the Algerian Ligue Professionnelle 2 since its establishment, and its fourth season under its current title. A total of 16 teams will contest the league.

Team overview

Stadiums and locations

League table

Result table

Clubs season-progress

Positions by round

Season statistics

Leader week after week

The bottom of the table week after week

Top scorers

See also
 2019–20 Algerian Ligue Professionnelle 1
 2019–20 Algerian Cup

References

External links
 Ligue de Football Professionnel
 Algerian Football Federation

Algerian Ligue 2 seasons
2
Algeria